The Isuzu Erga Journey-Q (kana:いすゞ・ジャーニQ) is a light-duty bus built by Isuzu. The range was primarily available city bus and tourist coach.

Models 
DBR370 (1976)
K-DBR370 (1979)
P-MR112F (1984)
P-MR112D (1986)
U-MR132D (1990)
U-GR432F (1991)
KC-GR433F (1996)
KK-GR433F (1999)

See also 

 List of buses

External links 

Buses of Japan

Isuzu buses
Vehicles introduced in 1976